Oregon World War II Army Airfields were the airfields built or repurposed during World War II for training pilots and aircrews of United States Army Air Forces (USAAF) fighters and bombers in Oregon.

Most of these airfields were under the command of Second Air Force or the Army Air Forces Training Command (AAFTC) (predecessor of the current-day United States Air Force Air Education and Training Command).  However the other USAAF support commands (Air Technical Service Command (ATSC); Air Transport Command (ATC) or Troop Carrier Command) commanded a significant number of airfields in a support roles.

It is still possible to find remnants of these wartime airfields. Many were converted into municipal airports, though some were returned to agriculture and several were retained as United States Air Force installations and were front-line bases during the Cold War. Hundreds of the temporary buildings that were used survive today, and are being used for other purposes.

Major airfields 
Second Air Force
 Corvallis AAF, Corvallis
 II Fighter Command
 Also known as MAAS Corvallis / MCAAF Corvalis (temp transfer to US Navy/US Marine Corps)
 Now: Corvallis Municipal Airport 
 Portland AAB, Portland
 44th Army Air Force Base Unit
 Now: Portland International Airport and  Portland Air National Guard Base 
 Joint use AAF/Navy/Civil Airport
 Redmond AAF, Redmond
 Sub-base of Portland AAF
 Now: Roberts Field Airport 
 Also several auxiliary fields (Aurora Flight Strip, Eugene Municipal Airport)

Air Technical Service Command
 Madras AAF, Madras
 Now: Madras Municipal Airport (was City-County Airport) 
 Medford AAF, Medford
 Joint use with US Navy
 Now: Medford Jackson County Airport 
 Pendleton Field AAF, Pendleton
 Spokane Air Service Command
 470th Army Air Force Base Unit
 Joint use with US Navy
 Now: Pendleton Regional Airport 
 Salem AAF, Salem
 Now: McNary Field Airport

See also 
 Lists of Oregon-related topics

References
 Maurer, Maurer (1983). Air Force Combat Units Of World War II. Maxwell AFB, Alabama: Office of Air Force History. .
 Ravenstein, Charles A. (1984). Air Force Combat Wings Lineage and Honors Histories 1947-1977. Maxwell AFB, Alabama: Office of Air Force History. .
 Thole, Lou (1999), Forgotten Fields of America : World War II Bases and Training, Then and Now - Vol. 2.  Pictorial Histories Pub . 
 Military Airfields in World War II - Oregon

External links

 01
World War II
Airfields of the United States Army Air Forces in the United States by state
United States World War II army airfields